Christine Nöstlinger (13 October 1936 – 28 June 2018) was an Austrian writer best known for children's books. She received one of two inaugural Astrid Lindgren Memorial Awards from the Swedish Arts Council in 2003, the biggest prize in children's literature, for her career contribution to "children's and young adult literature in the broadest sense." She received the Hans Christian Andersen Medal for "lasting contribution to children's literature" in 1984 and was one of three people through 2012 to win both of these major international awards.

Life and career

Nöstlinger was born in Vienna, Austria, in 1936.
By her own admission, she was a wild and angry child. After finishing high school, she wanted to become an artist, and studied graphic arts at the Academy of Applied Arts in Vienna. She worked as a graphic artist for a few years, before marrying a journalist, Ernst Nöstlinger, with whom she had two daughters.

The majority of Nöstlinger's production is literature for children and for young people, and she also writes for television, radio and newspapers. She centres on the needs of children in her work, with an anti-authoritarian bent. She does not shy away from tackling difficult subjects like racism, discrimination and self-isolation.

Her first book was Die feuerrote Friederike, published in 1970, which she illustrated herself. The book was published in English in 1975 as Fiery Frederica.

WorldCat reports that her work most widely held in participating libraries is Fly away home (Maikäfer flieg, 1973).

Awards and recognition
The biennial Hans Christian Andersen Award conferred by the International Board on Books for Young People is the highest recognition available to a writer or illustrator of children's books. Nöstlinger received the writing award in 1984.

 Friedrich Bödecker Prize (1972)
 German Youth Literature Prize Deutscher Jugendliteraturpreis (1973 - Wir pfeifen auf den Gurkenkönig (The Cucumber king); 1988)
 Austrian State Prize for Children's Literature (1974 - Achtung! Vranek sieht ganz harmlos aus (Attention! Vranek looks quite harmless); 1979 - Rosa Riedl Schutzgespenst (Rosa Riedl protection ghost))
 Viennese Youth Literature Prize (Kinder- und Jugendbuchpreis der Stadt Wien), five-time winner
 Mildred L. Batchelder Award for Konrad oder das Kind aus der Konservenbüchse (Konrad or the Child out of the Tin) (1979)
 Hans Christian Andersen Award (1984)
 Nestroy Ring (1986)
 Zurich Youth Literature Prize (Zürcher Kinderbuchpreis) for "La vache qui lit" (1990)
 First Prize of the Arts Foundation (1993)
 The inaugural Marsh Award for Children's Literature in Translation for Der Hund kommt! (English: A Dog's Life, translated by Anthea Bell), 1996
 Styrian Leseeule for Am Montag ist alles ganz anders (Monday everything is completely different) (1997)
 Honorary Award of the Austrian book trade for tolerance in thought and action (1998)
 Wild females Prize (2002)
 Astrid Lindgren Memorial Award (2003)
 Austrian Cross of Honour for Science and Art, 1st class (2003)
 Willy and Helga-Verlon sale price (2009)
 Book Prize of the Vienna Business (2010)
 Corine Honorary Award of the Bavarian Minister for lifetime achievement (2011)
 Grand Decoration of Honour for Services to the Republic of Austria (2011)
 Bruno Kreisky Prize for Political Books for her life's work (2011)
 Ten special books for Andersentag Lumpenloretta (2011)

Selected works

  
 Die feuerrote Friederike, 1970 (Fiery Frederica, 1975)
 Ein Mann für Mama, 1972
 Wir pfeifen auf den Gurkenkönig, 1972 (The Cucumber King, 1975) 
 Maikäfer flieg, 1973 (Fly away Home, 1975)
 , 1974
 Achtung! Vranek sieht ganz harmlos aus, 1974
 Konrad oder Das Kind aus der Konservenbüchse, 1975 (Conrad: The Factory-Made Boy, 1976)
 Die unteren 7 Achtel des Eisbergs, 1978
 Rosa Riedl Schutzgespenst, 1979
 Dschi-Dsche-i-Dschunior, 1980
 Das Austauschkind, 1982
 Am Montag ist alles ganz anders, 1984
 Haushaltsschnecken leben länger, 1985
 Der geheime Großvater, 1986
 Man nennt mich Ameisenbär, 1986
 Die nie geschriebenen Briefe der Emma K., 75, 1988
 Der Zwerg im Kopf, 1989
 Einen Löffel für den Papa, 1989
 Der gefrorene Prinz, 1997

See also

References

External links
  (German language)
 

1936 births
2018 deaths
Writers from Vienna
Austrian children's writers
Astrid Lindgren Memorial Award winners
Hans Christian Andersen Award for Writing winners
Austrian women writers
Recipients of the Austrian State Prize
Recipients of the Austrian Cross of Honour for Science and Art, 1st class
Recipients of the Grand Decoration for Services to the Republic of Austria
Austrian women children's writers
Women science fiction and fantasy writers
20th-century Danish women writers
20th-century Austrian writers